Arne Eigenfeldt (born 1962) is a Canadian composer and creator of interactive and generative music systems based in Vancouver, British Columbia. Both his music and his research into intelligent systems have been presented internationally. He is currently a professor of music at Simon Fraser University. He also produces electronica under the pseudonyms Raemus and loadbang.

Eigenfeldt has composed extensively for contemporary dance, especially in collaboration with choreographer Serge Bennathan. His electroacoustic music is predominantly live, generated or performed in software he has written in Max/MSP. His recent research focusses on encoding knowledge into intelligent performance systems. Eigenfeldt is also known for his goalkeeping skills in the local old-timers league, playing for virtually every team in the Fraser Valley.

Works and publications 

 
 Eigenfeldt, Arne. "Multi-agency and Real-time Composition: In Equilibrio." eContact! 11.4 — Toronto Electroacoustic Symposium 2009 (TES) / Symposium Électroacoustique 2009 de Toronto (December 2009). Montréal: CEC.
 Eigenfeldt, Arne. "In Search of Tools for the Laptop Ensemble." eContact! 13.3 — TES 2010 etc.: Toronto Electroacoustic Symposium 2010 / Symposium Électroacoustique 2010 de Toronto (June 2011). Montréal: CEC.

References

External links 
 

1962 births
Living people
Place of birth missing (living people)
Academic staff of Simon Fraser University
21st-century classical composers
20th-century classical composers
Canadian classical composers
Musicians from Vancouver
Artificial intelligence researchers
Electroacoustic music composers
Canadian male classical composers
20th-century Canadian composers
20th-century Canadian male musicians
21st-century Canadian male musicians